Cäcilie M. (Anna von Lieben, born Anna von Tedesco; 1847–1900) is the pseudonym of one of Freud's first patients, whom he called in 1890 his “principal client” and in 1897 his “instructress”.

Life
Born into a rich Austrian Jewish family, Anna von Lieben was referred to Freud in the late eighties for help with a long-standing series of nervous disorders.  After referring her for a consultation with Charcot, Freud treated her (with some short-term success) through hypnotism, taking her with him to see Hippolyte Bernheim in 1889 in the (unsuccessful) hope that he might be able to work a permanent cure.  He also used abreaction for temporary relief of her symptoms, noting however that her sense of guilt and self-reproaches would swiftly return after the treatment sessions.

Her symptoms, including hallucinations and physical spasms, provided the basis for many of Freud's claims about conversion hysteria; and how to interpret back from physical symptom or hallucination to the underlying (symbolic) emotional meaning it expressed, often by a 'punning' logic.

Criticism
Freud's later critics have argued that his continuing treatment of Anna, given awareness of her incurability, amounted to using her as a kind of cash-cow.

See also

References

Further reading

Peter J. Swales, 'Freud, his Teacher, and the Birth of Psychoanalysis', in Paul E. Stepansky ed., Freud, Appraisals and Reappraisals, (1986) 3-82

External links
 Cäcilie M., Case of

 Anna von Lieben, Gedichte (1867-1870)

 Anna von Lieben, Gedichte (1867-1873)

 

Case studies by Sigmund Freud
1847 births
1900 deaths
Austrian Jews
History of psychology
Women and psychology

de:Anna von Lieben